Tanida (written: 谷田) is a Japanese surname. Notable people with the surname include:

, Japanese volleyball player
, Japanese curler

See also
"Mako Tanida", an episode of the American television series The Blacklist

Japanese-language surnames